Hamed Ziad Tlemçani (born 10 May 1963) is a retired Tunisian footballer who played for Espérance in Tunisia, Vitória S.C. in Portugal and Vissel Kobe in Japan. He was a member of the Tunisian national team and scored 2 goals at 1998 African Cup of Nations in Burkina Faso.

Club statistics

National team statistics

Footnotes

References

External links

1963 births
Living people
Association football forwards
Tunisian footballers
Tunisia international footballers
1994 African Cup of Nations players
1998 African Cup of Nations players
Espérance Sportive de Tunis players
Vitória S.C. players
Vissel Kobe players
Primeira Liga players
J1 League players
Japan Football League (1992–1998) players
Tunisian expatriate footballers
Expatriate footballers in Portugal
Expatriate footballers in Japan
Tunisian Ligue Professionnelle 1 players